Woolley is a civil parish in the metropolitan borough of the City of Wakefield, West Yorkshire, England.  The parish contains 38 listed buildings that are recorded in the National Heritage List for England.  Of these, one is listed at Grade I, the highest of the three grades, one is at Grade II*, the middle grade, and the others are at Grade II, the lowest grade.  The parish contains the village of Woolley and the surrounding area.  Apart from the Grade I listed church, the most important building in the parish is Woolley Hall, which is listed together with associated structures and items in its grounds.  The other listed buildings include items in the churchyard, houses, cottages and associated structures, farmhouses and farm buildings, some of which have been converted into dwellings, a sheep dip, former schools, and a water cistern cover.


Key

Buildings

References

Citations

Sources

 

Lists of listed buildings in West Yorkshire